The women's 4 × 100 meter medley relay competition of the swimming events at the 1971 Pan American Games took place on 6 August. The defending Pan American Games champion is the United States.

It was the first time that the U.S. lost the gold in a relay event, at the Pan American Games.

Results
All times are in minutes and seconds.

Heats

Final 
The final was held on August 6.

References

Swimming at the 1971 Pan American Games
Pan